Tryptophan aminopeptidase may refer to:
 Tryptophanyl aminopeptidase, an enzyme
 Tryptophanamidase, an enzyme